is a Japanese anime storyboard artist and director. He made his full directorial debut in 2006 with Honey and Clover II, after which he had directed 2007's Idolmaster: Xenoglossia, 2008's Toradora!, 2009's A Certain Scientific Railgun, 2011's Anohana: The Flower We Saw That Day, 2012's Waiting in the Summer and 2013's A Certain Scientific Railgun S.

Filmography

Director
 2006: Honey and Clover II
 2007: Idolmaster: Xenoglossia
 2008–2009: Toradora!
 2009–2010: A Certain Scientific Railgun
 2011: Anohana: The Flower We Saw That Day
 2011: Kaitō Tenshi Twin Angel
 2012: Waiting in the Summer
 2013: A Certain Scientific Railgun S
 2015: The Anthem of the Heart
 2015–2017: Mobile Suit Gundam: Iron-Blooded Orphans
 2019: Her Blue Sky
 2020: A Certain Scientific Railgun T

Other
1989 – Super Mario's Fire Brigade (unit director)
2002 – Cosplay Complex (unit director)
2002 – G-on Riders (storyboards and unit director)
2002 – Mahoromatic: Motto Utsukushii Mono (unit director)
2002 – Witch Hunter Robin (unit director)
2003 – L/R -Licensed by Royal- (unit director)
2003 – Jubei ninpucho: Ryuhogyoku-hen (unit director)
2003 – Ikki Tousen (Storyboards)
2003 – Maburaho (assistant director)
2004 – Mai-HiME (unit director and storyboards)
2005 – Mahoraba ~Heartful Days~ (storyboards)
2005 – Honey and Clover (unit director)
2005 – Mai-Otome (unit director and storyboards)
2005 – Mushishi (unit director and storyboards)
2006 – Yomigaeru Sora - Rescue Wings (storyboards)
 2007 – Mobile Suit Gundam 00 (ED storyboards, episode direction)
 2007 – Potemayo (episode direction)
 2008 – KimiKiss: Pure Rouge (2nd OP storyboards, episode direction)
 2008 – Shigofumi: Letters from the Departed (episode direction)

References

 "Idol Master Xenoglossia". (November 2006) Newtype USA. p. 13.

External links
 
 Tatsuyuki Nagai anime at Media Arts Database 

Anime directors
Sunrise (company) people
Japanese film directors
People from Niigata Prefecture
1976 births
Living people